| tries               = {{#expr:
 + 4 + 8
 + 0 + 0
 + 0 + 0
}}
| top point scorer    = Juan Pablo Socino (Argentina Jaguars)15 points
| top try scorer      = 12 players1 try
| Player of the tournament =
| website             = Official website
| previous year       = 2013
| previous tournament = 2013 IRB Tbilisi Cup
| next year           = 2015
| next tournament     = 2015 World Rugby Tbilisi Cup
}}
The 2014 IRB Tbilisi Cup was the second edition of this international rugby union tournament, created by the International Rugby Board. It was played from 14 to 22 June 2014 at the Avchala Stadium in Tbilisi.

South Africa President's XV won the inaugural tournament in 2013 after winning all three of their games but did not return to defend their title.

Table

Fixtures
The fixtures and kick off times were announced on 4 April 2014.

Matchday 1

Matchday 2

Matchday 3

See also
 2014 IRB Nations Cup
 2014 IRB Pacific Nations Cup

References

External links

World Rugby Tbilisi Cup
2014 rugby union tournaments for national teams
2014 in Georgian sport
2014 in Argentine rugby union
2013–14 in Italian rugby union
2013–14 in Spanish rugby union